The Pico Agudo is a mountain in Brazil, near the town of Japira in Paraná.

It overlooks the BR-153 road, the Transbrasiliana Highway, about 8km North of Ibaiti.

It is a location for hang gliding and paragliding. Annual championships are held there between October and November.

References 

Landforms of Paraná (state)